Manania are a genus of stalked jellyfish in the family Haliclystidae.

Species 
The following lists described species of Manania :
Manania atlantica (Berrill, 1962)
Manania auricula (Fabricius, 1780)
Manania distincta (Kishinouye, 1910)
Manania gwilliami Larson & Fautin, 1989
Manania handi Larson & Fautin, 1989
Manania hexaradiata (Broch, 1907)
Manania uchidai (Naumov, 1961)

References

Haliclystidae
Medusozoa genera